Udita may refer to:

 Udita Goswami, Indian actress
 Udita (field hockey) (born 1998), Indian field hockey player